Eucla Airport is an airstrip in Eucla, Western Australia. It has one runway that is 1369 m long. It  has a Traffic Pattern Altitude of 305 m. It is mostly used by the Royal Flying Doctor Service of Australia, who completed 84 medical evacuations from the airstrip between 2009 and 2014. There is an ongoing campaign to upgrade the flood-prone airstrip. When it is unusable, aircraft must land on the nearby Eyre Highway.

See also
 List of airports in Western Australia
 Aviation transport in Australia

References

External links

Airservices Aerodromes & Procedure Charts

Airports in Western Australia